FC Neftchi Fergana (Uzbek Cyrillic: Нефтчи Фарғона футбол клуби) is an Uzbek football club based in Fergana. They play in the top division in Uzbekistani football and are multiple champions of Uzbekistan.

History
Neftchi was founded 1962 and appeared in the Soviet Second League (Central Asian Division) from 1962 to 1991 under the name Neftyanik Fergana. In 1990, the club advanced to the Soviet First League, winning Soviet Second League, conference East. In 1991 Soviet First League Neftchi ranked at 7th place which was club's highest achievement in Soviet football history. Since 1992, the club has been playing in the Uzbek League, and along with Pakhtakor Tashkent and Navbahor Namangan, continuously participated in all seasons of the Uzbek League without a break.

Domestic history

Continental record

Rivalries

Uzbek El Classico

Traditionally there is always rivalry between two strongest teams in any League in club football. Since 1992 in Oliy League in Uzbekistan those two clubs were Neftchi and capital club Pakhtakor Tashkent. Already in first edition of Oliy League in 1992 bothe teams finished first with the same points and were recognised as champions. This competition goes on over the years.
The match between Pakhtakor and Neftchi is held since 1992. The first match between the two clubs was played on 25 May 1992 in Tashkent.  The match of two rivals became later the name O'zbek Classikosi by analogy with Spanish Clasico.

Valley derbies
Neftchi's biggest local rival has always been Navbahor Namangan, club from Fergana Valley region. Like Neftchi also Navbahor along Pakhtakor continuously is playing in Uzbek League since 1992 without any break. This rivalry was always of enormous interest of both fans sides.

Another Neftchi's Valley rival is FK Andijan. Andijan was founded in 1964.

Stadium
Neftchi played ist home matches initially at Fargona Stadium. Fargona Stadium was built in 1932 and was home ground of the club until 2012. The stadium was closed for reconstruction. The plans for construction of the new arena in another location were unveiled in 2011. The construction works for new 20,000 seater arena named Istiqlol Stadium in Fergana started in January 2012 and were finished at the end of 2014. It was planned Neftchi would play its home matches at new stadium in 2015. Neftchi played its home matches in 2012–14 and some matches of 2015 seasons at Kirguli SM Stadium and Kokand Stadium.

The opening match of the new Istiqlol stadium was held on 3 April 2015 with a friendly between Uzbekistan U-20 and New Zealand U-20 which ended with 1–0 victory of host team. The first official League match at the new stadium was played on 18 April 2018 with match Neftchi – Mash'al Mubarek.

Honours

Domestic

League
Soviet Second League East conference
Winners (1): 1990
Uzbek League
Winners (5): 1992, 1993, 1994, 1995, 2001
Uzbekistan Pro League
Winners (1): 2021

Cups
Uzbek Cup
Winners (2):1994, 1996

Players

Current technical staff

Managerial history
 Arkadi Alov (1969–1970)
  Yuriy Sarkisyan (Jan 1987 – May 16, 2013)
 Amet Memet (2013–2014)
 Murod Ismoilov (May 16, 2013 – Sept 14, 2015)
 Andrey Fyodorov (Sept 15, 2015 – June 5, 2017)
 Vadim Abramov (June 5, 2017 – December 16, 2017)
 Sergey Kovshov (Januar 27, 2018 – present)

References

External links
FC Neftchi Official Club Website 
FC Neftchi – soccerway

Neftchi
Association football clubs established in 1962
1962 establishments in Uzbekistan